"Le Chat" is a 1992 song recorded by French act Pow woW. Written by the band's four members (Ahmed Mouici, Pascal Periz, Bertrand Pierre and Alain Chennevière), this a cappella song was the first single from its debut album Regagner les plaines, and was released in May 1992 with two different single covers for the formats: the first is a photo of the band on a red and black background, and the second is a drawing which shows a cat's tail. "Le Chat" had a great success in France where it was a number-one hit for seven weeks, becoming a popular song throughout the years, and was awarded 'Song of the year' in the 1993 Victoires de la Musique.

Cricial reception
Elia Habib, an expert of French charts, said that the song has "irresistible rhythms, notes, onomatopoeic sounds and vocals remarkably built on shrewdly exquisite contrasts and nuances"; he also stated: "The text, lively and original, is a sort of declaration of love vacillating between moving mewings and seductive purrs, before finishing in a hunter scratch".

Cover versions
In France, the song was covered in 2004 by Star Academy 4 on the album Les Meilleurs Moments; this cover features as seventh track on the album and is also available in instrumental version.

Chart performance
In France, "Le Chat" debuted at number 42 on the chart edition of 30 May 1992, then climbed quickly and finally entered the top ten in fifth week. It topped the chart two weeks later and stayed there for two months. Then it dropped slowly, totalling 18 weeks in the top ten and 28 weeks on the chart (top 50). "Le Chat" remained the only number-one single recorded a cappella. It was also the second biggest hit of 1992 in France, behind François Feldman's "Joy". In Belgium (Wallonia), it peaked at number five on 31 October 1992. On the European Hot 100, it stated at number 39 on 11 July 1992 and peaked at number 13 five weeks later, and fell off the chart after 21 weeks of presence.

Track listings
 CD single
 "Le Chat" — 2:54
 "Run on (God's Gonna Cut You Down)" — 2:23

 7" single
 "Le Chat" — 2:54
 "Run on (God's Gonna Cut You Down)" — 2:23

Charts and sales

Weekly charts

Year-end charts

See also
List of number-one singles of 1992 (France)

References

SNEP Top Singles number-one singles
Pow woW songs
1992 songs
1992 debut singles